Gary: A Sequel to Titus Andronicus is a play written by Taylor Mac. The play is set in the aftermath of William Shakespeare's Titus Andronicus. The play premiered on Broadway in April 2019 starring Nathan Lane and received seven Tony Award nominations.

Production
The play premiered on Broadway at the Booth Theatre in previews on March 11, 2019 and officially on April 21. The cast consisted of Nathan Lane (Gary), Kristine Nielsen (Janice), and Julie White (Carol). The production was directed by George C. Wolfe and produced by Scott Rudin, 
with scenic design by Santo Loquasto, costume design by Ann Roth, and lighting design by Jules Fisher and Peggy Eisenhauer.

Andrea Martin was originally set to appear in the production, but withdrew due to injury. Her role was assumed by Nielsen, while White was cast in Nielsen's former role.

The play received seven Tony Award nominations, including for Best Play and Best Featured Actress in a Play (White and Nielsen).

The play closed on June 16, 2019 after 45 previews and 65 regular performances.

Overview
The play is set in 400. Two servants, Gary and Janice, are cleaning up the bodies after the devastation of the civil war is over.

References

External links 
 

2019 plays
Titus Andronicus